Extremaduran Coalition is a political alliance in Extremadura, Spain. It consists of the Extremaduran Regional Convergence (CREx) and the Extremaduran Regionalist Party (PREx).

The coalition was represented in the Senate of Spain between 2005 and 2008 by Lidia Redondo Lucas, who was elected as a substitute on the Spanish Socialist Workers' Party list.

References

External links
 CE website

Political parties in Extremadura
Regionalist parties in Spain